Over 70 species and cultivars of clematis currently (2016) possess the Royal Horticultural Society's Award of Garden Merit, reflecting this plant's continued popularity in gardens in the United Kingdom. Clematis is a genus of woody based perennials, mostly climbers with a twining habit, though some are grown as groundcover or as herbaceous plants. They can be evergreen or deciduous. They bear flowers in all shades except black, pure blue, pure red and orange. The flowers are often large and showy. They can be single or double, fragrant or unscented, compact or vigorous, in a wide range of shapes and sizes. The flowering period varies from early spring to late summer. Many spring-flowering cultivars produce a second flush of blooms after the main display has finished, and many have attractive silky seed-heads prolonging the period of interest. Clematis can be grown against walls, fences, over pergolas and obelisks, or through other shrubs and trees.

Groups

Cultivars are placed in the following groups:-
A; Atragene group; medium-sized climbers with nodding, bellshaped flowers early in the season
Ad; Atragene double-flowered; medium-sized climbers with nodding, bell-shaped double blooms flowering in spring on previous year's growth
E; Early large flowered group; medium-sized climbers with large star-shaped flowers on previous season's growth, in spring and early summer, often with a second flush of blooms later in the season
Forsteri group; dwarf or spreading evergreen shrubs or climbers, with deeply cut leaves and small white or cream flowers
H; Heracleifolia group; subshrubs with long, scrambling stems and abundant small flowers on the current year's growth, in summer and autumn
I; Integrifolia group; small subshrubs with herbaceous growth, flowers in summer and autumn
L; Late large-flowered group; medium-sized climbers flowering in summer and early autumn on current year's growth, with large flowers
M; Montana group; vigorous climbers flowering early in the season
Md; Montana double-flowered group; vigorous climbers flowering in late spring and early summer
T; Tangutica group; large climbers with small bell-shaped flowers, usually in shades of yellow or white, late in the season, often followed by silky seed heads
Tx; Texensis group; climbers with bell- or tulip-shaped flowers in summer and autumn, on the current year's growth
V; Viticella group; pinnate leaves, nodding half-open flowers on current year's growth, in summer
Va; Vitalba group; substantial climbers with profuse, small, erect flowers on current year's growth, in summer and autumn; also used for groundcover

References

Clematis
Clematis